Songs from the Last Day on Earth  is the eighth studio album by Canadian solo artist David Usher. It was released on October 2, 2012 via MapleMusic Recordings label.

Track listing

Review

—CBC Music

References

External links

See The Stars - David Usher

2012 albums
David Usher albums
MapleMusic Recordings albums